Lək or Lyak or Lyaki may refer to:
Lək, Barda, Azerbaijan
Lək, Samukh, Azerbaijan
Lək, Ujar, Azerbaijan
Ləki, Azerbaijan

See also 
 Lek (disambiguation)